The 2006–07 Sacramento Kings season was the 62nd season of the franchise, its 58th season in the National Basketball Association (NBA), and its 22nd in Sacramento. They began the season hoping to improve upon their 44–38 output from the previous season. However, they came eleven wins shy of tying it, finishing 33–49. They missed the playoffs for the first time since  1998, and marked a downturn in the kings' history, as it started a long period of futility for the team. From 2007 to present, the Kings have failed to make NBA Playoffs as of the 2021–22 season.

Offseason
On July 8, the Kings signed power forward Lou Amundson. Amundson would be waived on October 26.

On July 24, the Kings signed John Salmons and Justin Williams. Salmons would play for Sacramento until 2009, when he was traded to the Chicago Bulls. Williams was waived on October 26, but would sign with the team during the season.

On August 15, the Kings signed center Loren Woods. Woods would be waived on October 24.

On October 3, the Kings signed Maurice Taylor. Taylor would play with the Kings until January 23, when he was waived.

On October 24, the Kings waived Loren Woods.

On October 26, the Kings waived Justin Williams and Lou Amundson.

Draft picks

Roster

Regular season

Standings

Record vs. opponents

Player statistics

Regular season 

|-
| 
| 80 || 45 || 25.2 || .474 || .150 || .726 || 5.0 || 1.4 || .7 || .5 || 9.9
|-
| 
| style=";"| 82 || style=";"| 82 || 34.0 || .404 || .360 || .830 || 3.2 || style=";"| 4.7 || 1.1 || .1 || 17.1
|-
| 
| 42 || 0 || 8.5 || .381 || .240 || .733 || .9 || .4 || .4 || .1 || 2.8
|-
| 
| 79 || 5 || 17.8 || .429 || .356 || .833 || 2.6 || 1.1 || .6 || .5 || 6.0
|-
| 
| 13 || 0 || 7.7 || .500 || style=";"| .500 || style=";"| .909 || 1.2 || .8 || .2 || .0 || 3.3
|-
| 
| 80 || 80 || 35.2 || .473 || .381 || .844 || 4.3 || 2.2 || 1.2 || .1 || style=";"| 20.2
|-
| 
| 63 || 56 || 28.3 || .453 || .152 || .772 || 6.4 || 3.6 || .6 || style=";"| .6 || 9.0
|-
| 
| 3 || 0 || 4.3 || .000 || . || . || .7 || .0 || .0 || .0 || .0
|-
| 
| 58 || 1 || 9.7 || .390 || .323 || .673 || 1.2 || .8 || .5 || .1 || 3.3
|-
| 
| 79 || 19 || 27.0 || .456 || .357 || .779 || 3.3 || 3.2 || .9 || .3 || 8.5
|-
| 
| 12 || 2 || 8.6 || .286 || . || .615 || 2.3 || .4 || .3 || .1 || 2.0
|-
| 
| 62 || 53 || 22.8 || .482 || .000 || .513 || 6.1 || 1.2 || .7 || .3 || 5.3
|-
| 
| 26 || 1 || 12.8 || style=";"| .614 || .000 || .365 || 4.4 || .1 || .2 || style=";"| .6 || 5.0
|-
| 
| 68 || 1 || 19.7 || .510 || .000 || .715 || 3.3 || .6 || .4 || .2 || 9.1
|-
| 
| 70 || 65 || style=";"| 37.7 || .440 || .358 || .740 || style=";"| 6.5 || 3.4 || style=";"| 2.1 || style=";"| .6 || 18.8
|}

References

Sacramento Kings seasons
Sacramento
Sacramento
Sacramento